John Crerar was the gamekeeper to the Duke of Atholl. He entered the service of the Duke in 1776, succeeding his father, Alexander Crerar, and remained an employee for more than sixty years. He is pictured in several paintings by Edwin Landseer, including The Death of a Stag at Glen Tilt and The Keeper John Crerar with his Pony.

He was an accomplished fiddler and composer and was a contemporary and pupil of Niel Gow, and his composition The Marquis of Tullibardine is still popular today.

He is alleged to have landed a 72 lb Salmon at Ferryhaugh, north of Dunkeld, 8 lbs heavier than the official record.

References

External links
 The Keeper John Crerar with his Pony by Sir Edwin Landseer
 Eilidh Scammell, John Crerar, A Highland Perthshire Fiddle Player 1750-1840

Scottish fiddlers
British male violinists
Scottish folk musicians
1750 births
1840 deaths